The , formerly Girls Professional Baseball League until 2012, was the highest level of women's baseball in Japan.

History

2019
On 26 August, it was announced that the league would suffer from severe contraction if new investors were not found and crowd number would not increase.
On 9 November, it was announced that over half of the league's players had been released ahead of the 2020 season. In December 2021, the league announced it would shut down indefinitely.

Teams

References

External links
 

Defunct women's baseball leagues
Professional sports leagues in Japan
2010 establishments in Japan
Sports leagues established in 2010
National championships in Japan
Women's sports leagues in Japan
Women's baseball in Japan
Defunct baseball leagues in Japan
2021 disestablishments in Japan
Sports leagues disestablished in 2021